Lick Branch is a stream in Cass County in the U.S. state of Missouri. It is a tributary of the South Grand River.

Lick Branch was so named for the mineral licks along its course which attracted wildlife.

See also
List of rivers of Missouri

References

Rivers of Cass County, Missouri
Rivers of Missouri